Vining is a surname. Notable people with the name include:

Daniel Vining Jr., American demographer
Ebenezer Vining Bodwell, Ontario businessman and political figure
Elizabeth Gray Vining, American librarian and author 
Frederick Vining (1790–1871), English actor
George Vining (1824–1875), English actor
John Vining, American lawyer and politician
Ken Vining (born 1974), American baseball player
Mike Vining (born 1944), American basketball coach
Mike Vining (soldier), sergeant major in the United States Army
Robert L. Vining Jr. (1931–2022), American judge
Steve Vining, American musician
 Samuel J. Vining, American politician

See also 

 Vining (disambiguation)